The Dongri Fort or the Dongri Hill Fort, locally known as the Janjire Dhavari Fort, is a fort in Mumbai, India. It is located in the Dongri area. It came under Maratha rule in 1739. Since then the locals and the church have been looking after the maintenance of the Fort, which was once repaired. Every year, during the month of October, the feast of Our Lady of Fatima is celebrated there. Many People from far off villages come to offer their prayers there. One can take a 360 degree view of the surroundings from this fort, with the Arabian sea at the West, the Vasai Fort at the North, the Borivali National Park at the East, and the Essel World and Water Kingdom at the South.

See also
List of forts in Maharashtra

References

Archaeological sites in Maharashtra